Gimer Ricardo Mendoza Gutiérrez (born 22 November 1997) is a Mexican professional footballer who plays as a forward for Atlante.

References

1997 births
Living people
Mexican footballers
Association football forwards
Inter Playa del Carmen players
Atlante F.C. footballers
Pioneros de Cancún footballers
Ascenso MX players
Liga Premier de México players
Tercera División de México players
Footballers from Quintana Roo